James Stokoe (12 July 1888 – 1970) was an English footballer who played in the Football League for Derby County, Durham City and Swindon Town.

References

1888 births
1970 deaths
English footballers
Association football forwards
English Football League players
Hartlepool United F.C. players
Swindon Town F.C. players
Derby County F.C. players
Durham City A.F.C. players